Alethorpe is a deserted medieval village site and former civil parish, now in the parish of Little Snoring, in the North Norfolk district, in the county of Norfolk, England. The village, which is one of around 200 lost settlements in Norfolk, was abandoned in the 16th century, probably as the consequence of the land being enclosed by the landlord of that time. It is occasionally referred to as Althorp in historical literature. In 1931 the parish had a population of 1.

History
The name 'Alethorpe' means 'Ali's outlying farm/settlement'.

The village of Alethorpe is mentioned in the Domesday Book. In the survey Alethorpe is recorded by the name of Alatorp and was a small settlement with a taxable value of 0.6 geld. The land was held by King William. A late Saxon disc brooch was discovered on the site in 1985.

Alethorpe was also recorded in the Nomina Villarum surveys. In the surveys Alethorpe is recorded as being a village of thirty houses in 1272, twelve taxpayers 1329, eleven in 1332, and twelve in 1377. It was recorded that there were ten heads of families in 1496.

The village was abandoned in the 16th century, probably due to land enclosure. The parish church, which was dedicated to All Saints, which was in use in 1552, was being used as a barn by 1602 and was in poor repair by that date. Three skeletons were unearthed in 1962 in what is assumed to be the churchyard.

By the middle of the 19th century Alethorpe was classified as an extra-parochial area in the Gallow Hundred, from 1858 Alethorpe was a civil parish in its own right, although united with Fakenham for religious purposes. until it was abolished on 1 April 1935 and merged with Little Snoring. In 1869 the parish consisted of just one farm with a population of four. By 1891 it had a population of nine and in 1911 this had fallen again to five.

Modern Alethorpe
Alethorpe Hall, which is a modern building, stands on the site of the deserted village. A tree stands on the site of the church. A few low and generally indistinct earthworks remain along with possible track ways and a house platform, whilst a flint built barn at the hall dates from 1677. A small row of cottages, named Alethorpe Cottages, lie along the A148 road to the south-east of the deserted village site.

References

External links
 
 

Deserted medieval villages in Norfolk
Archaeological sites in Norfolk
Former civil parishes in Norfolk
North Norfolk